Teays may refer to:

Teays River, a major preglacial river that drained much of the present Ohio River watershed in a more northerly downstream course
Teays, West Virginia, an unincorporated community in Putnam County

See also
Teays Valley, West Virginia